Itomia opistographa is a species of moth in the family Erebidae first described by Achille Guenée in 1852. It is found in North America.

The MONA or Hodges number for Itomia opistographa is 8555.1.

References

Further reading

External links

 

Omopterini
Articles created by Qbugbot
Moths described in 1852